Bernard "Barney" Hahn (August 24, 1860 – September 6, 1931) was a farmer and a politician.

Born in Luxemburg, Kewaunee County, Wisconsin, Hahn went to public school. He moved with his parents to Sturgeon Bay, Wisconsin where they owned a hotel. Later, Hahn built the first opera house in Sturgeon Bay. Hahn was a farmer and grew fruit. He lived in Fish Creek, Door County, Wisconsin. Hahn served in the Wisconsin State Assembly and was a Republican. Hahn died in a hospital in Sturgeon Bay, Wisconsin from complications after surgery. In 1931, Hahn was charged with arson for setting fire to his personal property; the arson case ended when he died.

Notes

External links

1860 births
1931 deaths
People from Sturgeon Bay, Wisconsin
People from Luxemburg, Wisconsin
Businesspeople from Wisconsin
Farmers from Wisconsin
Republican Party members of the Wisconsin State Assembly
People from Door County, Wisconsin